Enne Petha Raasa is a 1989 Indian Tamil-language drama film directed by Siraj and produced by Rajkiran who is also credited for the story. The film stars Ramarajan, Rupini, Srividya and Vinu Chakravarthy. It was released on 27 January 1989.

Plot

Cast 

Ramarajan
Rupini
Goundamani
Rajkiran as Johnny
Srividya
Vinu Chakravarthy
Sadhana as Catherine [Extended Guest]
Senthil
Thideer Kannaiah
G. Srinivasan
Ilavarasan
Durga Sakthivel
Krishnamoorthy
Haja Sherif
Bayilvan Ranganathan
Thairvadai Desikan
Idichapuli Selvaraj
Vellai Subbaiah
Periya Karuppu Thevar
Karuppu Subbiah

Soundtrack 
The music was composed by Ilaiyaraaja.

Reception 
The Indian Express wrote, "Ennai Peththa Raja has an unmistakable rural flavour which despite its filmi turns keeps things going for it".

References

External links 
 

1980s Tamil-language films
1989 drama films
1989 films
Films scored by Ilaiyaraaja
Indian drama films